David Stewart may refer to:

Public servants

Great Britain
David Stewart, Earl of Strathearn (1357–c. 1386), Scottish magnate
David Stewart, Duke of Rothesay (1378–1402), heir to the throne of Scotland
David Stewart (bishop) (died 1476), Bishop of Moray
David Stewart, Earl of Moray (c. 1455–1457), son of King James II of Scotland
David Stewart (RAF officer) (1890–1924), World War I flying ace
David Stewart (Scottish politician) (born 1956), Scottish politician

United States
David Stewart (Maryland politician) (1800–1858), U.S. Senator from Maryland
David W. Stewart (1887–1974), U.S. Senator from Iowa

Canada
J. David Stewart (1910–1988), businessperson and political figure in Prince Edward Island
David A. Stewart (politician) (1874–1947), Canadian politician

Musicians
Dave Stewart (musician and producer) or David A. Stewart (born 1952), English musician and record producer best known for his work with Eurythmics
Dave Stewart (keyboardist) (born 1950), keyboard player with UK progressive rock bands in the 1970s and best known for his 1981 hit version of "It's My Party" with Barbara Gaskin
David Stewart (songwriter and producer), English songwriter, record producer and musician most famous for producing "Dynamite" by the South Korean band BTS

Sportsmen
David Stewart (footballer, born 1869) (1869–1933), Scottish footballer with Queen's Park, Scotland
David Stewart (footballer, born 1947) (1947–2018), Scotland international goalkeeper
David Stewart (cricketer, born 1948), Scottish cricketer
David Stewart (cricketer, born 1924), Scottish cricketer
David Stewart (American football) (born 1982), American football player
Davie Stewart, Scottish footballer  
David Stewart (rugby union) (1871–1931), New Zealand rugby union player, also known as Dick Stewart
Heta Stewart (1869–1909), New Zealand Māori rugby union player, also known as David Stewart

Other people
David Stewart (major-general) (1772–1829), Scottish soldier and author
David Stewart (master blender) (born 1945), longest serving master blender in the drinks industry, at William Grant & Sons, Scotland
David Stewart (photographer) (born 1958), British photographer and director
David J. Stewart (1915–1966), American Broadway, film, and television actor
David K. Stewart (1937–1997), American special effects artist, Star Trek: The Motion Picture
David O. Stewart (born 1951), American lawyer and author
David R. Stewart, acquitted suspect in the strip-search prank call scam

See also
Dave Stewart (disambiguation)
David Stuart (disambiguation)